Barley is an English surname. Notable people with the surname include:

 Bryan Barley (born 1960), English rugby union player
 Candace Barley (born 1991), American rugby player
 Henry Barley (disambiguation), multiple people
 Jack Barley (1887–1956), English cricketer
 John E. Barley (born 1945), American politician
 Katarina Barley (born 1968), German politician, former Federal Minister of Justice
 Les Barley (born 1967), American football player
 M. W. Barley (1909–1991), English historian and archaeologist
 Nigel Barley (disambiguation), multiple people
 Stephen R. Barley (born 1953), American organizational theorist
 Tom Barley (born 1987) British racing driver
 William Barley (died 1614), English bookseller and publisher
 Scott Barley (born 1992), British filmmaker and artist

 Fictional people
 Nathan Barley main character of the 2005 British sitcom of the same name

References 

English-language surnames